Chakra is a focal point in ancient meditation practices.

Chakra may also refer to:

Arts and entertainment
 Chakra (1981 film), a 1981 Hindi film
 Chakra (2021 film), an Indian Tamil-language action thriller film 
 Chakra: The Invincible, an Indian animated superhero film
 Chakra (group), a South Korean musical group
 Chakra (album), 2002
 Chakra (trance duo), a British music group 
 Chakrā, a group of Melakarta ragas, fundamental musical scales in Carnatic music

Computing 
 Chakra (JScript engine), developed by Microsoft for Internet Explorer 9
 Chakra (JavaScript engine), developed by Microsoft for Microsoft Edge
 Chakra (operating system)

Other uses
 Chakra (chess variant)
 Chakra River, western India
 Chaqra, village in southern Lebanon
 Georges Chakra, a Lebanese haute couture fashion designer
 , the name of two submarines of the Indian Navy

See also
 
 
 Chakram (disambiguation)
 Chacra, a Spanish term for a small or garden farm